Michael Joseph Fanucci (born September 28, 1949) is a former American football defensive end in the National Football League for the Washington Redskins, Houston Oilers, and Green Bay Packers. He later played with the Montreal Alouettes and Ottawa Rough Riders of the Canadian Football League. He played college football at Arizona State University.

Fanucci attended Dunmore High School and played football there; he graduated in the class of 1967.

Family: Colby Carbajal, Jake Carbajal, Mindy Carbajal, Marcus Fanucci, Al Fanucci, Tony Fanucci

References

1949 births
Living people
American football defensive linemen
Players of American football from Pennsylvania
Green Bay Packers players
Houston Oilers players
Montreal Alouettes players
Ottawa Rough Riders players
Washington Redskins players
Arizona State Sun Devils football players

\